Zulin may refer to the following villages in Poland: 
Żulin, Lublin Voivodeship
Żulin, Masovian Voivodeship

See also
Zhulin (disambiguation)
Zhu Lin (disambiguation)